French Pete Creek is a tributary of the South Fork McKenzie River in Lane County, in the U.S. state of Oregon. The creek has two named tributaries—Olallie Creek and, further downstream, Pat Creek—both of which enter from the right.

The stream derives its name from an early-day shepherd who grazed his flock along the valley. The shepherd's last name is unknown.

French Pete Trail, which crosses the stream twice, runs along the creek's valley. The trail begins near French Creek Campground, at the confluence of the creek with the river. Campground amenities include 17 tent, car, and trailer sites, picnic tables, vault toilets, and drinking water. The campground is generally open from early April to mid-September.

In the 1970s, environmentalists and timber interests clashed over a "substantial stand of young timber with a high potential value at maturity" along the creek, according to Oregon Geographic Names. In 1978, most of the French Pete Creek valley was added to the Three Sisters Wilderness.

See also
List of rivers of Oregon

References

External links
 McKenzie Watershed Council

Rivers of Lane County, Oregon
Rivers of Oregon